Gibson's Bakery v. Oberlin College was an Ohio legal case concerning libel, tortious interference, and infliction of distress. The case ultimately involved questions about the responsibilities of universities during student protests. 

The case began in 2016 with an incident of shoplifting by a black Oberlin College student at Gibson's Bakery, and subsequent arrest of three black students for assaulting a staff member. Students, faculty members and employees of Oberlin College protested against the bakery, alleging racism. Meredith Raimondo, the dean of students and vice-president at Oberlin College, took part in the protest, distributing a pamphlet falsely alleging racism on the part of the bakery. Oberlin initiated financial sanctions against the bakery and lent material support to protestors. The owners of the bakery sued Oberlin College and Raimondo for damages.

A jury found that the college had defamed the owner of Gibson's Bakery and his family and awarded them $44 million in compensatory and punitive damages in 2019. The trial judge reduced the total award to $25 million due to Ohio state law capping punitive damages. The trial court also awarded the bakery $6 million for legal fees. The college appealed the decision. In 2022, the Ninth Ohio District Court of Appeals unanimously upheld the 2019 jury verdict which found that the college defamed, inflicted distress and illegally interfered with Gibson's Bakery; the court also upheld the damages award. Oberlin College then sought review by the Supreme Court of Ohio, but that effort failed when the court declined to accept jurisdiction on August 30, 2022.

Oberlin College announced that it would no longer contest the matter and would pay Gibson's Bakery the sum of $36.59 million (the judgment amount plus interest) on September 8, 2022. Gibson's Bakery received the entire payment in December 2022.

Background
Gibson's Bakery is a fifth-generation family business established in Oberlin, Ohio in 1885. Half of the city's 8,000 residents are students (3,000) or employees (1,000) of Oberlin College. Local merchants are reportedly frequent targets of shoplifting by students of the school. According to police records, there were four robberies at Gibson's Bakery and 40 adults were arrested for shoplifting between 2011 and 2016, 33 of whom were college students. According to Gibson's, the bakery loses thousands of dollars to shoplifters every year. The owner of a nearby Ben Franklin store reported losing more than $10,000 a year to shoplifters.

2016 shoplifting incident
On Wednesday, November 9, 2016, underage black Oberlin College student Jonathan Aladin attempted to purchase a bottle of wine using a fake identification card. Store clerk Allyn D. Gibson, a son and grandson of the owners, rejected the fake ID. Gibson noticed that the student was concealing two other bottles of wine inside his jacket. According to a police report, Gibson told  Aladin that he was contacting the police; Gibson then pulled out his phone to take a photo of the student, but Aladin slapped it away, striking Gibson's face. Aladin ran out of the store, but Gibson followed and then grabbed and held onto him outside. This all took place after Aladin had also assaulted store owner David Gibson. Oberlin students Cecelia Whettstone and Endia Lawrence, friends of the shoplifter, joined the scuffle. When the police arrived, they witnessed Gibson lying on the ground with the three students punching and kicking him. The police report stated that Gibson sustained a swollen lip, several cuts, and other minor injuries. The police arrested the students, charging all three with assault and Aladin with robbery as well. In August 2017, the three students pleaded guilty, stating that they believed that Gibson's actions were justified and were not racially motivated. Their plea deals carried no jail time in exchange for restitution, the public statement, and a promise of future good behavior. From their trial courtroom, Assistant Dean of Students Antoinette Myers sent dean of students and vice-president Meredith Raimondo a text message: "I hope we rain fire and brimstone on that store."

Response
The day after the incident, faculty and hundreds of students gathered in a park across the street from Gibson's Bakery protesting what they saw as racial profiling and excessive use of force by Gibson toward Aladin. The Oberlin Student Senate immediately passed a resolution saying that the bakery "has a history of racial profiling and discriminatory treatment of students and residents alike", calling for all students to "immediately cease all support, financial and otherwise, of Gibson's" and calling upon Oberlin College President Marvin Krislov to publicly condemn the bakery.

The Student Senate resolution was emailed to all Oberlin students and was publicly mounted in a display case at the school’s student center, where it remained for a year. For about two months, the college ordered its campus food provider to suspend its purchasing agreement with the bakery for the school's dining halls, in what it said was an attempt to de-escalate the protests.

Oberlin blamed the bakery for bringing the protests on itself, claiming that "Gibson bakery's archaic chase-and-detain policy regarding suspected shoplifters was the catalyst for the protests.... The guilt or innocence of the students is irrelevant to both the root cause of the protests and this litigation."

During a meeting with Gibson's, Oberlin stated that it would consider reinstating the business relationship if the bakery agreed to not bring criminal charges against first-time shoplifters. According to the civil complaint filed by the bakery, Gibson's was worried that such a policy would cause an increase in future shoplifting. Oberlin made a proposal to all local businesses that, if a business would contact the college instead of the police when students were caught shoplifting, the college would advise the students that they would face legal charges if caught shoplifting a second time.

Some observers viewed the Oberlin protests as a reaction to the election of Donald Trump as President. In the opinion of attorney William A. Jacobson, "On a different campus on a different day, it is unlikely a simple shoplifting case would have gained much attention." In September 2018, Oberlin student Sophie Jones wrote an opinion column in a student publication reminiscing about the 2016 protests: "The 2016 presidential election was fresh; the violence at Gibson’s, to me, felt like another, more personal reminder that white complacency like my own was a delusion, a two way mirror behind which systemic racism operated unhindered". Longtime black Oberlin resident Eric Gaines testified, "The election occurred the night before.... People were anxious and it was like a time bomb ready to explode." Oberlin president Krislov wrote in a November 2016 letter to faculty and students: "This has been a difficult few days for our community, not simply because of the events at Gibson's Bakery, but because of the fears and concerns that many are feeling in response to the outcome of the presidential election."

A former administrator said that Oberlin's recent drop in enrollment caused the school to be wary of disagreeing with its students. "A freshman from an East Coast big city might come to Oberlin and find there is little for a social justice warrior to do in a small town like this, so they get frustrated and make issues like this shoplifting thing bigger than it should be, and the school follows along."

Retired Oberlin professor Roger Copeland was also critical of the protests, writing a year after the protests began: "It’s embarrassing when one has to ask Oberlin students the same question one asks climate change deniers: At what point do you accept the empirical evidence, even if that means having to embrace an 'inconvenient' truth? ... The time has come for the Dean of Students Meredith Raimondo, on behalf of the College, to apologize to the Gibson family." Raimondo reacted to Copeland's statement in a private text message: "Fuck him. I'd say unleash the students if I wasn't convinced this needs to be put behind us." Conor Friedersdorf, a writer for The Atlantic, argued that college administrators at Oberlin "calculatingly wield some control over whether student activists are aggressive or restrained".

An email from Vice President of Communications Ben Jones read, "All these idiots complaining about the college hurting a 'small local business' are conveniently leaving out their massive (relative to the town) conglomerate and price gouging on rents and parking and the predatory behavior toward most other local business. Fuck 'em."

Lawsuit and trial

Civil complaint
In November 2017, Gibson's Bakery filed a civil complaint against Oberlin for libel, slander, interference with business relationships, and interference with contracts in the Lorain County Court of Common Pleas. Gibson's argued that the college supported the protests that damaged its reputation and that the college unlawfully broke its contract with the bakery. In the complaint, the Gibson family alleged that some Oberlin College professors attended the demonstrations, joined in the chants with a bullhorn, and gave course credit to students who skipped class to attend the demonstrations. It also claimed Oberlin employees distributed boycott flyers and allowed them to be photocopied for free on school machines.

Trial evidence
Oberlin dean of students Meredith Raimondo joined the protestors along with other college officials, bringing the students pizza, authorizing the purchase of winter gloves for students protesting in cold weather, and helping to pass out flyers urging passersby to boycott Gibson's. Jason Hawk, a reporter and editor with the Oberlin News-Tribune, testified that Raimondo blocked him repeatedly from photographing the protest, telling him that he did not have a right to photograph the student protestors and handing him a flyer that read "This is a RACIST establishment with a LONG ACCOUNT of RACIAL PROFILING and DISCRIMINATION."

Local police records showed no previous accusations of racial profiling by Gibson's Bakery. Of the 40 adults arrested for shoplifting from the bakery in a five-year period, only six were black. As a part of the three students' guilty plea in August 2017, each read a statement saying, "I believe the employees of Gibson’s actions were not racially motivated. They were merely trying to prevent an underage sale." Reporters obtained an email written by Emily Crawford, an employee for the school's communications department, telling her bosses that she found the protests "very disturbing". "I have talked to 15 townie friends who are poc [persons of color] and they're disgusted and embarrassed by the protest. In their view, the kid was breaking the law, period.... To them this is not a race issue at all." During the trial, Eddie Holoway, a black man who worked his way through technical college while working at Gibson’s Bakery, testified that the racist allegations against his former employer were untrue. "In my life, I have been a marginalized person, so I know what it feels like to be called something that you know you’re not. I could feel his pain. I knew where he was coming from." Clarence "Trey" James, a black man employed at Gibson's since 2013, testified that he had observed no racist treatment of customers or employees. "Never, not even a hint. Zero reason to believe, zero evidence of that." Trey also told the student-run Oberlin Review, "When you steal from the store, it doesn't matter what color you are. You can be purple, blue, green; if you steal, you get caught, you get arrested."

During the trial, the defense said that the lawsuit was an attempt by the bakery to "profit from a divisive and polarizing event." Oberlin argued that purchasing food and gloves for protesters was not an endorsement of the protests. It also argued that the two-month suspension of Gibson's dining hall agreement was an attempt to de-escalate the protests, but Gibson's replied that students interpreted the decision as the school taking the side against the bakery, inflaming the protests instead. Oberlin also argued that any statements that may have been made about the Gibsons being racist or having a history of racial profiling were opinions and could not be libelous.

Verdict and responses
In June 2019, the jury found in favor of the Gibson family, awarding $11 million in compensatory damages, before further hearings on punitive damages and legal fees.

Oberlin released a statement disagreeing with the outcome, asserting it not only did not defame the bakery, but also attempted to repair the damage caused by the protests. "Colleges cannot be held liable for the independent actions of their students. Institutions of higher education are obligated to protect freedom of speech on their campuses and respect their students' decision to peacefully exercise their First Amendment rights." Attorney Lee Plakas representing the Gibson family in the trial responded "The recent efforts of Oberlin College and President Ambar to reframe this as a First Amendment issue, while undermining the jury's decision, should be incredibly concerning to us all. Oberlin College was never on trial for the free speech of its students. Instead, the jury unanimously determined that Oberlin College libeled the Gibsons." Oberlin College president Carmen Twillie Ambar told CBSN, "The jury found those statements in the flyer, and in the Senate Resolution, were statements that they thought were libelous. What we've been saying is we didn't write those statements... The college didn't construct the flyer, the college didn't condone the flyer, it didn't write the Student Senate resolution... There was one administrator there who was representing the institution, and the student handbook requires her to be there... There may have been some professors who were there operating in their own individual capacity, but they weren't representing the institution."

The jury later awarded the plaintiffs $33 million in punitive damages, for a total award of $44 million. At the end of the month, Judge John Miraldi reduced the total award to $25 million because state law limits punitive damages. In July 2019, the court ordered Oberlin to pay an additional $6.5 million as reimbursement for Gibson's attorney fees and other legal expenses.

Appeals
On October 8, 2019, the college appealed the case to the Ohio Ninth District Court. Days later, Gibson's Bakery filed their own appeal, asking for review of Ohio's statutory caps on monetary damages, rulings made by Judge Miraldi on motions, and the exclusion of expert witness testimony in the trial. Oberlin College filed their principal appeals brief June 5, 2020. Oral arguments by the parties were made in the Ohio Ninth District Court of Appeals on November 11, 2020, and made public on YouTube. On March 31, 2022, the Court overruled the appeals of both Oberlin and Gibson, upholding the jury verdict and Judge Miraldi's decisions.

In September 2021, the judge unsealed remarks Allyn D. Gibson made on his Facebook account from 2012 to 2017 in which he expressed resentment of being accused of racism and made disparaging remarks about a large portion of the local black community. These posts were not offered or allowed as evidence at trial. The Gibsons' legal defense argued that since Oberlin College attorneys did not attempt to introduce the Facebook posts as evidence, they "waived any argument that these materials were admissible."

On April 1, 2022, the Ninth Ohio District Court of Appeals dismissed Oberlin College's appeal. In a unanimous decision, the three judge panel upheld the jury verdict that Oberlin College defamed, inflicted distress, and illegally interfered with the bakery. The damages were capped by Ohio state law at $25 million in total damages, in place of the jury's original verdict of $11.1 million in compensatory and $33.2 million in punitive damages. Oberlin was also ordered to pay $6.3 million in attorney's fees to the bakery.

Oberlin College sought review by the Supreme Court of Ohio on May 13, 2022, and later moved to stay enforcement of the $31.3 million award and fees. The Court granted Oberlin College's motion for stay while it considered the parties' briefs but declined to accept jurisdiction on August 30, 2022, on a 4-3 ruling: Chief Justice O'Connor and Justices Kennedy, Fischer and DeWine declined jurisdiction, while Justices Donnelly, Stewart, and Brunner JJ. dissented. Oberlin College published a statement expressing disappointment in the Supreme Court's decision not to review the jury verdict or the evidential and procedural rulings of the Lorain County Court of Common Pleas. The bakery's counsel praised the decision and told reporters "Oberlin tried to frame this case with claims and issues that weren’t on trial. This has never been a case about a student's First Amendment rights. Individuals' reputations should never be sacrificed at a false altar of free speech."

Payment
On September 8, 2022, Oberlin College announced that the Trustees had determined the college "would not pursue the matter further" and had agreed to pay Gibson's Bakery the sum of $36.59 million representing the judgement with interest. In December 2022, Gibson's Bakery received $36.59 million from Oberlin College, all of the money owed to it. "This matter has been painful for everyone", said the college, "we hope that the end of the litigation will begin the healing of our entire community".

References

Oberlin College
African-American-related controversies
United States defamation case law
2019 in United States case law
2019 controversies in the United States
2019 in Ohio
Bakeries of the United States